Put a ring on it may refer to:
 Single Ladies (Put a Ring on It), 2008 Beyoncé song
 "Put a Ring on It", The Game episode, see List of The Game episodes
 A euphemism for marriage proposal
 "Put a Ring on It (TV series)", a 2020 American reality television series on OWN